The Duvall Farm is a farm located in North Laurel, Howard County, Maryland, now the site of Coastal Sunbelt Produce.

The Duvall Farm is a historic farm worked by descendants of one of Maryland's earliest settlers, Mareen Duvall (1625–1699). The Duvall farm is situated on Whiskey Bottom Road, a historic path that once linked Mareen Duvall's Davidsonville plantation to other family plantations formed as settlers moved westward. Martenet's 1860 Map of Howard County Maryland shows the farm along the crossroads of Route One, where George Washington once travelled. Robert L. Duvall and his wife Margret owned the property against the B&O tracks giving it the name "Elm Ridge". The site was the low point where barrels of Maryland Rye Whiskey would be delivered from nearby distilleries to load on trains, giving it the name "Whiskey Bottom". In 1914, a freight train struck the barn co-owned by Dr. Warfield and Duvall containing 6000lb of tobacco.

In 1991, a Laurel man was charged with killing and setting his girlfriend Cathy May Baier on fire next to the race track, which resulted in a brush fire.

In April 2013 the Duvall Farm was burned from large brush fires that were considered connected to arson on the Laurel Fuel and Oil Company. Fire investigators ordered the house demolished rather than stabilize the historic structure.

The farm is adjacent to Laurel Park, a historic race track in bankruptcy following a decade long initiative to legalize slot gambling at tracks and rezoned for high density "transit-oriented development" under growth policies of Parris Glendening. The Duvall agricultural farm was rezoned for Transit Oriented Development in anticipation of an unfunded rail stop adjacent to the already existing stop servicing Laurel Park requested by Kenneth Ulman, whose father is on the Maryland Racing Commission.

In 2014, Ulman provided a "development fast track" to relocate Coastal Sunbelt's facilities from Savage, Maryland. The Transit Oriented Development zoning was rapidly amended to include light industrial uses in January 2014. Since spot zoning for the benefit of a single entity is illegal, the zoning law also included a provision to expedite a former planning and zoning director's Joseph Rutter's housing development project around the Rosa Bonheur Memorial Park Cemetery. Ulman was quoted in a newspaper saying "I think this was the fastest rezoning in Howard County history, because this about job creation. We had to get it done,". Coastal Sunbelt Produce was offered $1 million in loans and $150,000 in Howard County tax credits to relocate to a 240,000-square-foot Preston Scheffenacker Properties facility built on the Duvall Farm with a 99-year lease. The new facility covering the majority of the 33-acre site had a groundbreaking on August 18 with Lieutenant Governor Anthony Brown attending. The 900-employee Coastal Sunbelt operation claims it will add 400 new jobs to meet the terms of its state loan.

External links
YouTube video of Duvall Farmhouse demolishing

See also
Mareen Duvall
Duvall Bridge (Laurel, Maryland)
Belair Mansion (Bowie, Maryland)
Savage Mill

References

Howard County, Maryland landmarks
Houses in Howard County, Maryland
Duvall family